Sir Neil Richard Calver (born 4 September 1963) is a British High Court judge.

He was educated at Dartford Grammar School and was a chess champion in the Kent area at under-18 and other levels. He completed a first-class BA in law at Christ's College, Cambridge in 1986.

He was called to the bar at Gray's Inn in 1987 and practised commercial and European law, initially from 4–5 Gray's Inn Square and then Brick Court Chambers from 1994. He took silk in 2006 and was appointed a recorder in 2009.

On 1 October 2020, he was appointed a judge of the High Court, replacing Dame Sue Carr who was promoted to the Court of Appeal, and he was assigned to the Queen's Bench Division. He received the customary knighthood in the same year. He sits on the Commercial Court, Admiralty Court, Administrative Court and also hears criminal cases.

In 2009, he married Marie-Eleni Demetriou (a fellow barrister) and together they have a son and a daughter. He has another daughter from a previous marriage. He supports Charlton Athletic FC and recreationally mountain climbs.

References 

Living people
1963 births
21st-century English judges
Knights Bachelor
Alumni of Christ's College, Cambridge
Members of Gray's Inn
Queen's Bench Division judges
People educated at Dartford Grammar School